Ponerorchis monantha is a species of plant in the family Orchidaceae native from south-east Tibet to south-central and north-central China.

Taxonomy
The species was first described by Achille Eugène Finet in 1902, as Peristylus monanthus. It was later transferred to Orchis and to Amitostigma. A molecular phylogenetic study in 2014, in which it was included as Amitostigma monanthum, found that species of Amitostigma, Neottianthe and Ponerorchis were mixed together in a single clade, making none of the three genera monophyletic as then circumscribed. Amitostigma and Neottianthe were subsumed into Ponerorchis, with this species becoming Ponerorchis monantha.

References

External links 
 

monantha
Flora of North-Central China
Flora of South-Central China
Flora of Tibet
Plants described in 1902